Gothic Peak is a peak,  high, standing  northwest of Lavallee Peak, in the West Quartzite Range of Victoria Land, Antarctica. This topographical feature was so named by the Northern Party of the New Zealand Federated Mountain Clubs Antarctic Expedition (NZFMCAE), 1962–63, for its likeness in profile to a Gothic Cathedral. The peak lies situated on the Pennell Coast, a portion of Antarctica lying between Cape Williams and Cape Adare.

References

Mountains of Victoria Land
Pennell Coast